"Leave Me Alone" is a song by American rapper Flipp Dinero. It was released as a single on September 4, 2018. The song was produced by Young Forever Beats and Cast Beats. The song received a boost from Odell Beckham Jr. dancing in an Instagram video. It was then featured in NBA Live 19, released in 2018. The song soon started to gain traction in September 2018 when it became the most added song on rhythmic radio on the week of September 11, 2018. It was named one of the five hip hop singles to watch of fall 2018 by Forbes.

Music video
The video was released via WorldStarHipHop on May 15, 2018.

Chart performance
Leave Me Alone debuted at number 96 on the US Billboard Hot 100 chart on the chart dated September 29, 2018. On the chart dated February 9, 2019, the song reached its peak on the number 20 on the chart. On November 6, 2020, the song was certified quadruple platinum by the Recording Industry Association of America (RIAA) for combined sales and streaming data of over four million units in the United States.

Personnel
Credits adapted from Tidal.

 Young Forever – production
 Cast Beats – production

Charts

Weekly charts

Year-end charts

Certifications

References

2018 singles
2018 songs
Epic Records singles
Songs written by DJ Khaled
Trap music songs